Lucky Ward (born November 1, 1964) is an American murderer and suspected serial killer who strangled two people in September 2010 in Houston, Texas, but has been linked to at least four additional homicides dating back to 1985, with which he has not been charged. Convicted and sentenced to death on two counts after a 10-year delay in his trial, he is currently on death row.

Early life and crimes
Lucky Ward was born on November 1, 1964, in Brazoria County, Texas. He grew up in an unstable home, where he was harshly treated by his disciplinarian father and was sexually abused by an uncle. These experiences affected his mental health and led him to develop a schizoaffective disorder. At age 14, he raped an 83-year-old woman in Brazoria County, but his first arrest came two years later for an unspecified crime.

Around the early 1980s, Ward moved to Houston, where he lived on the streets and occasionally earned money as a day laborer. From 1984 onwards, he was repeatedly arrested and served time for a variety of crimes, including soliciting prostitutes; possession and delivery of drugs; robbery; aggravated assault with a deadly weapon; assault causing bodily injury; resisting arrest; theft; failure to identify himself to law enforcement and criminal mischief. He continued to be unruly even when imprisoned, as he frequently attempted to escape confinement or assaulted prison staff.

Murders
Ward's modus operandi primarily consisted of targeting victims he perceived as "vulnerable" - they were predominantly homeless women living on the streets or in homeless shelters, but also included male-to-female transsexuals and victims of opportunity. Each victim was tortured before death and then ultimately strangled, but none were robbed or sexually assaulted. Due to this, some investigators have suggested that he committed the killings to satisfy a lust for power and control.

The first murder that has been linked to Ward dates back to April 1985, when the body of a woman named Birdell Louis was found behind a gas station in downtown Houston. Unlike his later victims, there were no apparent indications that Louis was homeless, but fingerprint evidence suggested that Ward was present at the crime at the time of her death. She was identified as a possible victim of his in 2013.

No further murder victims have been linked to Ward until 2010, when he is suspected to have begun a months-long killing spree. The first suspected victim was 51-year-old Myra Chanel Ical, a transgender woman who worked as a janitor. She was found dead near a trash container on 4300 Garrott on January 18, shortly after heading home from a Tejano concert. In February, Ward was arrested and imprisoned for two weeks for soliticting the services of a prostitute. On June 18, the partially decomposed body of 24-year-old Raquel Antoinette Mundy, a single mother with two children from Galveston, was found in a grassy field on 300 St. Charles, near some railroad tracks. While dropping off her mother and children at a Greyhound bus station, Mundy's car was towed, leaving her stranded. She was last seen entering the car of a stranger in the downtown depot.

On September 13, 46-year-old Carlos "Gypsy" Rodriguez, a transgender woman and hairdresser, was found dead in her apartment. Though she was found nude and covered with a blanket, an autopsy found no signs of sexual assault. On September 30, Ward met with 52-year-old Reita Lafaye Long, a former teacher and acquaintance of his who lived on the streets, who was sitting in front of the steps of the Co-Cathedral of the Sacred Heart. According to later interviews, the pair got into a heated argument that turned violent, and Ward strangled her with her own bra on the spot. After stealing her purse, cellphone and a bus pass, he left her body on the steps, where it was soon discovered by a security guard.

The final suspected victim was 62-year-old Carol Elaine Flood, a homeless woman. She was found on the outside stairwell of a YMCA building on 1600 Louisiana on October 10. Flood was strangled to death with a ligature, nude from the waist down with injuries to her face.

Arrest, trial, and imprisonment
Due to the sudden rise of strangulation murders with a similar modus operandi, officers from the Houston Police Department started taking a thorough look at the cases. They eventually managed to extract a DNA sample from fingernail scrapings and the bra found wrapped around Long's neck, which were submitted to CODIS. In early November, it was matched to Ward, who was then tracked down to a block on 2900 San Jacinto, where he was arrested and soon after charged with capital murder. The news came as a relief to Long's partner, Robert Ausberry, who expressed his gratitude to the detectives.

On the same day, Ward readily confessed to killing and explained what had happened, but was unable to provide a reason why. He ceased cooperating with police after he was provided with a lawyer, but after gathering enough evidence from the Long case and comparing it to the other murders, investigators charged him with the Rodriguez murder as well. As for the remaining killings, it was deemed that the evidence was too insufficient to hold up in court. District Attorney Kim Ogg eventually announced that she would seek the death penalty in his case, due to the severity of the crimes.

For the next ten years, Ward's murder trial would be delayed on numerous occasions. Among the reasons as to why this occurred was the prosecution's requests for more time to retest the DNA evidence, difficulty in finding witnesses and a trial date being cancelled due to Hurricane Harvey. This was made even worse by Ward's own behavior, as he was sanctioned for threatening to harm jail staff, attempting suicide on multiple occasions and misusing his medication. In 2018, another court appearance was delayed after he was charged with crafting a shank while incarcerated at the Harris County Jail. That same year, a sheriff's spokesman labeled him one of the most dangerous and high-maintenance inmates to be detained in the county.

When the trial began, Ward continued to act out on several occasions, ranging from refusing to leave his holding cell and wearing a yellow jumpsuit to court proceedings because he wanted to. When given the option to testify on his behalf, he initially contemplated doing it, but ultimately refused to do so. He was eventually found guilty for the murders of Rodriguez and Long by jury verdict after less than five hours of deliberation and summarily sentenced to death. He showed no reaction while the verdict was read out, but as he was escorted out of the courtroom, he turned towards one of his victims' family members and said that he was sorry.

As of September 2022, Ward remains on death row at the Allan B. Polunsky Unit in West Livingston and is currently appealing his sentence.

See also
 Capital punishment in Texas
 List of death row inmates in Texas

References

External links
 Texas Inmate Locator

1964 births
20th-century American criminals
21st-century American criminals
American male criminals
American people convicted of assault
American people convicted of drug offenses
American people convicted of murder
American people convicted of robbery
American people convicted of theft
American prisoners sentenced to death
Criminals from Texas
Living people
People convicted of murder by Texas
People from Brazoria County, Texas
People with schizoaffective disorder
Prisoners sentenced to death by Texas
Suspected serial killers
Violence against women in the United States
Violence against trans women